Corinne Rey-Bellet (2 August 1972 – 30 April 2006) was a Swiss alpine skier.

Rey-Bellet shared a World Championship silver medal in the downhill event in St. Moritz in 2003 (in a tie with Alexandra Meissnitzer) and won a total of five World Cup races. Her "double win" in January 16th, 1999, at St. Anton am Arlberg is the only double win in female Alpine World Cup Races. She retired in 2003 because of a series of injuries to her right knee.

Death

Rey-Bellet was shot and killed in her parents' home in the Swiss village of Les Crosets, Canton Valais on Sunday, 30 April 2006 by her husband Gerold Stadler. She was three months pregnant. Her brother Alain, who was to have been married the following Friday, was also killed, and her mother Verena was severely injured. Corinne's two-year-old son, Kevin, home at the time of the attack, was left unharmed, and Corinne's father was not home at the time.

A warrant was issued for the arrest of her husband. The couple had separated approximately 10 days before the murders took place. Stadler – a private banker with Credit Suisse and captain in the Swiss Armed Forces – was the father of their two-year-old son. His body was recovered in a forest on 3 May 2006. The Swiss police eventually confirmed that Stadler committed suicide using the same gun – his military weapon – with which he had killed Rey-Bellet and her brother.

World cup victories

References

External links
 

1972 births
2006 deaths
2006 crimes in Switzerland
Swiss female alpine skiers
Alpine skiers at the 1992 Winter Olympics
Alpine skiers at the 1994 Winter Olympics
Alpine skiers at the 1998 Winter Olympics
Alpine skiers at the 2002 Winter Olympics
Olympic alpine skiers of Switzerland
Deaths by firearm in Switzerland
Swiss murder victims
People murdered in Switzerland
Murder–suicides in Europe
20th-century Swiss women